Henry Hawkins Downing (April 20, 1853 – January 28, 1919) was an American Democratic politician who served as a member of the Virginia Senate, representing the state's 12th district.

References

External links
 
 

1853 births
1919 deaths
Democratic Party Virginia state senators
19th-century American politicians
People from Fauquier County, Virginia